Kvernes is a former municipality in Møre og Romsdal county, Norway. The municipality existed from 1838 until its dissolution in 1964.  Originally, it encompassed the whole island of Averøya, part of the Romsdal peninsula, part of the island of Nordlandet, and part of the island of Frei.  Over time it gradually got smaller until 1964, when the  municipality was merged into Averøy Municipality.  The administrative centre of the municipality was the village of Kvernes where Kvernes Stave Church (built in the 14th century) and the Kvernes Church (built in the 19th century) are both located.

History
The municipality of Kværnes was established on 1 January 1838 (see formannskapsdistrikt law). According to the 1835 census, the municipality initially had a population of about 3,754. On 1 January 1878, a small area in the western part of Bud Municipality (population: 15) was transferred to Kvernes. Then again on 1 January 1891, the Bollien farm (population: 15) was transferred from Bud to Kvernes. On 1 September 1893, parts of Kvernes Municipality (population: 477) along with parts of Frei Municipality and Øre Municipality were used to create the new Gjemnes Municipality.

On 1 January 1897, the large municipality of Kvernes was divided into four areas to create the municipalities of Eide, Kornstad, Bremsnes, and (a much smaller) Kvernes.  The remaining part of Kvernes had a population of 857. On 8 July 1903, an uninhabited area of Bremsnes was transferred over to Kvernes. During the 1960s, there were many municipal mergers across Norway due to the work of the Schei Committee.  On 1 January 1964, Kvernes was merged with most of Kornstad and Bremsnes municipalities to create the new Averøy Municipality. Prior to the merger, Kvernes had a population of 693.

Government
All municipalities in Norway, including Kvernes, are responsible for primary education (through 10th grade), outpatient health services, senior citizen services, unemployment and other social services, zoning, economic development, and municipal roads.  The municipality is governed by a municipal council of elected representatives, which in turn elects a mayor.

Municipal council
The municipal council  of Kvernes was made up of representatives that were elected to four year terms.  The party breakdown of the final municipal council was as follows:

See also
List of former municipalities of Norway

References

Averøy
Eide
Kristiansund
Former municipalities of Norway
1838 establishments in Norway
1964 disestablishments in Norway